This is a list of the municipalities of Åland sorted by population as of 30 September 2012 (30 September 2011):

 Mariehamn (Maarianhamina) 11,366 (+0,9%)
 Jomala 4,321 (+2,7%)
 Finström 2,541 (+0,2%)
 Lemland 1,879 (+1,5%)
 Saltvik 1,814 (+0,6%)
 Hammarland 1,525 (+0,9%)
 Sund 1,041 (+2,0%)
 Eckerö 961 (-0,5%)
 Föglö 575 (-0,2%)
 Geta 494 (+2,3%)
 Brändö 482 (-0,6%)
 Vårdö 442 (-2,9%)
 Lumparland 396 (-1,0%)
 Kumlinge 343 (-5,0%)
 Kökar 244 (-3,6%)
 Sottunga 102 (-4,7%)

External links 
 vrk.fi
 The official ÅSUB website

 
Aland
Municipalities by population
Aland
Aland